Jason Cope (known as Benoit Franc) is a South African actor. He starred and played multiple roles in the 2009 Academy Award-nominated science fiction film District 9.

Career
In 2004, Cope played a variety of roles on the second season of the SABC1 comedy show The Pure Monate Show.  In 2008, he played the character of Howard Weaver in the MNet miniseries Ella Blue.  The title character of the miniseries was portrayed by actress Nathalie Blott, who would go on to costar with Cope in the film District 9.  Since 2010, he has also played a "Field Reporter" on eTV's satirical news show Late Nite News with Loyiso Gola.

In the 2009 film District 9, Cope played a variety of characters including the alien Christopher Johnson, created entirely through CGI using Cope's motion captured performance.  This process creates a character modeled on the performance of an actor or actress, allowing for on-camera performances including interaction with the other cast members.  He also played the character Grey Bradnam, one of the narrators of the film, and provided the majority of the background voice work in the film, including the cameraman Trent.  In a deleted scene of the movie, Cope also played a doctor at a clinic visited by the film's protagonist, who was seeking to have his arm amputated due to being infected with alien DNA.  The scene is featured as part of the movie's DVD "extras."

In 2010 he also had a costarring role in the South African-produced film Spud, opposite veteran actor John Cleese.

In 2012 Cope had a minor role in DREDD 3D as one of the thugs killed during the film's introduction sequence. In 2015, he played a Tetravaal Lead Mechanic in Neill Blomkamp's science-fiction film Chappie.

Filmography
 2013 - Spud 2: The Madness Continues — Sparerib
 2013 - Dredd — Zwirner
 2012 - Mermaids: The Body Found (TV documentary) — Dr. Rodney Webster
 2011 - Spoon — Conway
 2010 - Spud — Sparerib / Mr. Wilson
 2009 - District 9 — Grey Bradnam / UKNR Chief Correspondent / Christopher Johnson
 2008 - Doomsday — Wall guard
 2008 - Ella Blue (TV series) — Howard Weaver
 2007 - Big Fellas — Fabio / Wimpie
 2007 - Flood — Young survivor
 2006 - Bunny Chow — Cope
 2006 - Alive in Joburg — UN Official / alien

References

External links

Living people
South African male film actors
South African male television actors
Year of birth missing (living people)